Never Dream of Dying, first published in 2001, was the seventh novel by Raymond Benson featuring Ian Fleming's secret agent, James Bond (including film novelizations). Carrying the Ian Fleming Publications copyright, it was first published in the United Kingdom by Hodder & Stoughton and in the United States by Putnam.

Plot summary
It begins when a police raid goes horribly wrong, killing innocent men, women, and even children. Bond knows the Union is behind the carnage, and vows to take them down once and for all. His hunt takes him to Paris, into a deadly game of predator and prey, and a fateful meeting with the seductive Tylyn Mignonne, a movie star with a sordid past, who may lead Bond to his final target—or his own violent end. Eventually it leads him to the Union's latest attack on society, which involves Tylyn's husband, Leon Essinger, and his new movie, Pirate Island, which stars Tylyn.

The conclusion to Benson's Union Trilogy. Locations are Nice, Paris, Cannes, Monte Carlo and Corsica (also briefly in Los Angeles, Japan and Chicago).

Publication history
 UK first hardback edition: 3 May 2001 Hodder & Stoughton
 US first hardback edition: June 2001 Putnam
 UK first paperback edition: November 2001 Coronet Books
 US first paperback edition: May 2002 Jove Books

See also
 Outline of James Bond

References

James Bond books
2001 British novels
Novels by Raymond Benson
Hodder & Stoughton books